Elections to Perth and Kinross Council were held on 4 May 2017, the same day as the other Scottish local government elections. The election covered the twelve wards created as a result of the Local Governance (Scotland) Act 2004, with each ward electing three or four councillors using the single transferable vote system form of proportional representation, with 40 Councillors being elected, a reduction of 1 member compared to 2012.

Following the 2012 election a Scottish National Party minority administration took over the running of the Council with the support of the Scottish Conservatives. After this election, the Conservatives and Liberal Democrat groups formed a coalition with independents to run the administration. The sole Labour councillor, Alasdair Bailey, was initially named as part of the coalition, but soon insisted that he was not.

In September 2019, the coalition ended as the Conservative group voted to continue in a minority administration.

Election results

Note: "Votes" are the first preference votes. The net gain/loss and percentage changes relate to the result of the previous Scottish local elections on 3 May 2007. This may differ from other published sources showing gain/loss relative to seats held at dissolution of Scotland's councils.

Ward results

Carse of Gowrie
2012: 2xSNP; 1xCon
2017: 1xSNP; 1xCon; 1xLab
2012-2017 Change:1xLab Gain from SNP

Strathmore
2012: 2xSNP; 1xCon; 1xLib Dem
2017: 2xCon; 1xSNP; 1xLib Dem
2012-2017 Change: 1xCon Gain from SNP

 = Sitting Councillor from Almond and Earn Ward.

Blairgowrie and Glens
2012: 2xSNP; 1xCon
2017: 2xCon; 1xSNP
2012-2017 Change: 1xCon Gain from SNP

Highland
2012: 2xSNP; 1xCon
2017: 1xCon; 1xSNP; 1xIND
2012-2017 Change: 1xIND gain from SNP

Strathtay
2012: 2xSNP; 1xCon
2017: 2xCon; 1xSNP
2012-2017 Change: 1xCon Gain from SNP

Strathearn
2012: 1xSNP; 1xCon; 1xPICP
2017: 1xSNP; 1xCon; 1xPICP
2012-2017 Change: No Change

Strathallan
2012: 1xCon; 1xSNP; 1xLib Dem
2017: 2xCon; 1xSNP
2012-2017 Change: 1xCon gain from Lib Dem

Kinross-shire
2012: 2xIndependent; 1xLib Dem; 1xSNP
2017: 1xCon; 1xSNP; 1xLib Dem; 1xIND
2012-2017 Change:1xCon gain from IND

Almond and Earn
2012: 1xCon; 1xSNP; 1xIndependent
2017: 2xCon; 1xSNP
2012-2017 Change: 1xCon gain from IND

Perth City South
2012: 1xLib Dem; 1xCon; 1xSNP; 1xLab
2017: 1xLib Dem; 1xCon; 2xSNP; 
2012-2017 Change: 1xSNP gain from Lab

Perth City North
2012: 2xSNP; 2xLab
2017: 2xSNP; 1xCon
2012-2017 Change: 1xCon gain from Lab

	
		

*served as councillor for the SNP in previous term

Perth City Centre
2012: 1xSNP; 1xLib Dem; 1xLab; 1xCon
2017: 1xCon; 2xSNP; 1xLib Dem
2012-2017 Change: 1xSNP gain from Lab

Changes since 2017
† On 25 September 2017, Perth City South Conservative Cllr Michael Jamieson resigned his seat having been found to be in possession of indecent images. A by-election took place on 23 November 2017. The seat was won by the Conservative candidate, Audrey Coates.
†† On 6 February 2018 Highland Conservative Cllr Ian Campbell died suddenly. A by-election was held on 19 April 2018 and was won by the Conservative candidate John Duff.
††† On 19 February 2020 Perth City North SNP Cllr David Doogan resigned his seat having been elected as an MP for Angus at the 2019 UK Parliament Election. A by-election was held on 26 November 2020 and won by the SNP candidate Ian Massie.
†††† On 26 March 2020 Perth City South SNP Cllr Bob Band died after a long battle with cancer. A by-election was held on 26 November 2020 and won by the Liberal Democrat candidate Liz Barrett.
††††† On 27 December 2020 Almond and Earn SNP Cllr Henry Anderson died having contacted Coronavirus. A by-election was held on 25 March 2021 and won by the Conservative candidate Frank Smith.
†††††† On 29 March 2021 Kinross-shire Cllr Mike Barnacle joined the Conservative group.

By-elections since 2017

References 

 candidates standing for election

2017 Scottish local elections
2017